Henri Barbé (14 March 1902, Paris – 24 May 1966, Paris) was a French Communist, and later, fascist politician.

Life
A metallurgical worker, at 15 he joined the Young Socialists.  Attending the Third International, he naturally opted for the French Communist Party (PCF), at the split of the Congress of Tours.

In 1926, he was promoted to secretary general of the Young Communists.

In 1928, he was a member of the executive of the Comintern.

In 1929, he replaced Pierre Sémard as head of the PCF, in a team which also included Maurice Thorez and Pierre Célor.

In 1931, he was questioned in the course of a meeting of the BP (Bureau Politique), attended by Dmitry Manuilsky, Secretary of the Third International. Ejected from the BP (and replaced by Thorez) during case which was known as the Barbé-Célor affair. He took a long stay in Moscow and wrote a number of self criticisms. Returning to France, Barbé was eventually expelled from the Communist Party in 1934 for having "ultra-left" positions. 

In 1934, he and Jacques Doriot founded the French Popular Party (PPF).

Under the occupation, he joined the National Popular Rally (RNP) under Marcel Déat.  Condemned to forced labour in 1944 after the liberation of France, he was released at the end of 1949, and participated in the anti-communist magazine Est & Ouest which sought to promote "reasoned and scientific anticommunism".  In 1959, he converted to Catholicism and was baptised.  Until his death in 1966, he regularly collaborated in the monthly Catholic review Itinéraires founded by Jean Madiran in 1956.

Sources
Philippe Robrieux, Histoire intérieure du parti communiste, T1 and T4, Fayard

1902 births
1966 deaths
Christian fascists
Politicians from Paris
French anti-communists
French Communist Party politicians
French Popular Party politicians
Former Marxists
National Popular Rally politicians
Politicians of the French Third Republic
French collaborators with Nazi Germany
French politicians convicted of crimes